William Hayes (20 April 1891 – 2 August 1972) was a British wrestler. He competed in the lightweight event at the 1912 Summer Olympics.

References

External links
 

1891 births
1972 deaths
Place of death missing
Olympic wrestlers of Great Britain
Wrestlers at the 1912 Summer Olympics
British male sport wrestlers
People from Paddington
Sportspeople from London